"Love → Building on Fire" (read as "Love Goes to Building on Fire") is a song by rock band Talking Heads, released as a single in 1977. The single preceded the band's debut album by seven months, and was recorded before keyboardist and guitarist Jerry Harrison joined the band. As the single was the first piece of music released commercially by the band, its release was cited as a milestone in the band's history in its Rock and Roll Hall of Fame entry.

The song did not appear on any of the band's original studio albums, though it was later included on their 1992 compilation album Sand in the Vaseline: Popular Favorites, on their 2003 box set Once in a Lifetime, and as a bonus track on a reissue of Talking Heads: 77. A live recording of the song is featured on their live album The Name of This Band Is Talking Heads.

Track listing

Personnel
Adapted from Talking Heads: 77 liner notes.

David Byrne – guitar, lead vocals
Chris Frantz – drums, steel pan,
Tina Weymouth – bass guitar

The original recorded version was produced by Tony Bongiovi. The horns in the song were arranged by Brad Baker and Lance Quinn. Mastered by Ted Jensen.

Artistic impressions of the song
Jerry Harrison called "Love → Building on Fire" one of his favorite songs to play live, despite the fact the song was recorded before he joined the band. Harrison stated that he and Byrne "used to get a wonderful interplay of guitars that was a bit like early Television". However, he felt that the best live performances were never recorded.

References

Talking Heads songs
1977 debut singles
Songs written by David Byrne
Sire Records singles
Song recordings produced by Tony Bongiovi
1977 songs
Song recordings produced by Tommy Ramone